Cebu City Public Library and Information Center traces its roots from the Cebu Branch Library of the Philippine Library and Museum, now the National Library of the Philippines. It was organized and opened to the public on April 13, 1919, by Mr. Guillermo Restun, the Chief Librarian from the Ilo-ilo Branch. The province of Cebu took charge of the initial collection and other maintenance and operating expenses. Since its establishment, the public library has been housed in many different buildings until in 1938 an edifice was inaugurated for the library. The Rizal Memorial Library and Museum Building became its permanent home. This entire three story building served as a fount of knowledge among education-conscious Cebuanos.

When the Second World War broke out, the library was closed. The building was utilized as headquarters by the Japanese Army, and books were either dumped, ruined or stolen. In 1953, the institution was reopened due to public clamor. The Cebu City Government appropriated a budget for the library collection and other operating expenses.

Close for Good
In December 2008, an announcement was made by Cebu City Acting Mayor Mike Rama that Cebu City's Rizal Memorial Library would be closed for good. Pressure from Friends of the Cebu City Public Library, with the help of media exposure, led to the welcome news that the building would be renovated for three to six months and the library restored. The renovation, however, has still not been completed, even though a report indicated that "Acting" Mayor Michael Rama wanted the library fully renovated before the end of the year.

Operations and facilities
The Cebu City Public Library and Information Center has started its 24-hour operations on March 9, 2018, upon the directive of Mayor Tomas Osmeña, it is the country's first public library that will be open for 24 hours.

Carrier-grade Smart Wifi is now available to students, researchers and other visitors of the Cebu City Public Library and Information Center.

In comparing the data of the number of visitors in the year 2017 and 2018, there had been an increase from 26,000 to 103,000 or 296%.

The Library is also attributed to the success of students.

References

External links

Libraries in the Philippines
Buildings and structures in Cebu City
Library buildings completed in 1938
20th-century architecture in the Philippines